The 442nd Infantry Regiment was an infantry regiment of the United States Army. The regiment is best known as the most decorated in U.S. military history and as a fighting unit composed almost entirely of second-generation American soldiers of Japanese ancestry (Nisei) who fought in World War II. Beginning in 1944, the regiment fought primarily in the European Theatre, in particular Italy, southern France, and Germany. The 442nd Regimental Combat Team (RCT) was organized on March 23, 1943, in response to the War Department's call for volunteers to form the segregated Japanese American army combat unit. More than 12,000 Nisei (second-generation Japanese American) volunteers answered the call. Ultimately 2,686 from Hawaii and 1,500 from U.S. concentration camps assembled at Camp Shelby, Mississippi in April 1943 for a year of infantry training. Many of the soldiers from the continental U.S. had families in concentration camps while they fought abroad. The unit's motto was "Go for Broke".

The 442nd Regiment is one of the most decorated units for its size in U.S. military history. Created as the 442nd Regimental Combat Team (
 Dai Yonhyakuyonjūni Rentai Sentōdan) when it was activated 1 February 1943, the unit quickly grew to its fighting complement of about 4,000 men by April 1943, and an eventual total of about 10,000 men served overall. The unit including the 100th Infantry Battalion earned, in less than two years, more than 4,000 Purple Hearts and 4,000 Bronze Star Medals. The unit was awarded seven Presidential Unit Citations (seven between 1944 and 1946, five earned in one month). Twenty-one of its members were awarded the Medal of Honor. In 2010, Congress approved the granting of the Congressional Gold Medal to the 442nd Regimental Combat Team and associated units who served during World War II, and in 2012, all surviving members were made chevaliers of the French Légion d'Honneur for their actions contributing to the liberation of France and their heroic rescue of the Lost Battalion.

Arriving in the European Theatre, the 442nd Regimental Combat Team, with its second and third infantry battalions, one artillery battalion and associated HQ and service companies, was attached to the 34th Infantry Division. On 11 June 1944, near Civitavecchia, Italy, the 100th Infantry Battalion, another all-Nisei fighting unit which had already been in combat since September 1943, was transferred from the 133rd Infantry Regiment to the 442nd Regimental Combat Team. Because of its combat record, the 100th was allowed to keep their original designation as the 100th Infantry Battalion. The related 522nd Field Artillery Battalion liberated at least one of the satellite labor camps of Dachau concentration camp and saved survivors of a death march near Waakirchen.

The 442nd RCT was inactivated in 1946 and reactivated as a reserve battalion in 1947, garrisoned at Fort Shafter, Hawaii. The 442nd lives on through the 100th Battalion/442nd Infantry Regiment, and is the only current infantry formation in the Army Reserve. 
More information about the current 100th Battalion/442nd Infantry Regiment and its current alignment with the active 25th Infantry Division, the reserve 9th Mission Support Command, and its combat duty in the Vietnam War and the Iraq War can be found at 100th Infantry Battalion (United States).

The 100th/442nd's current members carry on the honors and traditions of the historical unit. In recognition of its storied combat record, the 100th/442nd was also one of the last units allowed to use its individual shoulder sleeve insignia. In the interest of greater division unity, they officially relinquished their patch in 2016.

Background
Most Japanese Americans who fought in World War II were Nisei, born in the United States to immigrant parents. Shortly after the Imperial Japanese Navy's attack on Pearl Harbor on 7 December 1941, Japanese-American men were initially categorized as 4C (enemy alien) and therefore not subject to the draft. On 19 February 1942, President Franklin D. Roosevelt signed Executive Order 9066, authorizing military authorities.

to prescribe military areas in such places and of such extent as he or the appropriate Military Commander may determine, from which any or all persons may be excluded, and with respect to which, the right of any person to enter, remain in, or leave shall be subject to whatever restrictions the Secretary of War or the appropriate Military Commander may impose in his discretion.

Although the order did not refer specifically to people of Japanese ancestry, it was targeted largely for the internment of people of Japanese ancestry from the West Coast. In March 1942, Lieutenant General John L. DeWitt, head of the Western Defense Command and Fourth Army, issued the first of 108 military proclamations that resulted in the forced relocation from their residences to guarded concentration camps of more than 110,000 people of Japanese ancestry from the West Coast, the great majority of the ethnic community. Two-thirds were born in the United States.

In Hawaii, the military imposed martial law, complete with curfews and blackouts. As a large portion of the population was of Japanese ancestry (150,000 out of 400,000 people in 1937), internment was deemed not practical; it was strongly opposed by the island's business community, which was heavily dependent on the labor force of those of Japanese ancestry (this contrasts with the business communities on the mainland that competed with Japanese American businesses, and which exploited the opportunity to buy up Japanese American properties that had to be surrendered). It was accurately believed that an internment of Japanese Americans and Japanese immigrants in Hawaii would have had catastrophic results for the Hawaiian economy; intelligence reports at the time noted that "the Japanese, through a concentration of effort in select industries, had achieved essential roles in several key sectors of the economy in Hawaii." In addition, other reports indicated that those of Japanese descent in Hawaii "had access to virtually all jobs in the economy, including high-status, high-paying jobs (e.g., professional and managerial jobs)," suggesting that a mass internment of people of Japanese descent in Hawaii would have negatively impacted every sector of the Hawaiian economy. When the War Department called for the removal of all soldiers of Japanese ancestry from active service in early 1942, General Delos C. Emmons, commander of the U.S. Army in Hawaii, decided to discharge those in the Hawaii Territorial Guard, which was composed mainly of ROTC students from the University of Hawaii. However, he permitted the more than 1,300 Japanese-American soldiers of the 298th and 299th Infantry Regiment regiments of the Hawaii National Guard to remain in service. The discharged members of the Hawaii Territorial Guard petitioned General Emmons to allow them to assist in the war effort. The petition was granted and they formed a group called the Varsity Victory Volunteers, which performed various military construction jobs. General Emmons, worried about the loyalty of Japanese-American soldiers in the event of a Japanese invasion, recommended to the War Department that those in the 298th and 299th regiments be organized into a "Hawaiian Provisional Battalion" and sent to the mainland. The move was authorized, and on 5 June 1942, the Hawaiian Provisional Battalion set sail for training. They landed at Oakland, California on 10 June 1942 and two days later were sent to Camp McCoy, Wisconsin. On 15 June 1942, the battalion was designated the 100th Infantry Battalion (Separate)—the "One Puka Puka".

Partly because of the actions of the 100th and the Varsity Victory Volunteers, the War Department directed that a Japanese-American Combat Team should be activated comprising the 442d Infantry Regiment, the 522d Field Artillery Battalion, and the 232d Engineer Combat Company.

The order dated 22 January 1943, directed, "All cadre men must be American citizens of Japanese ancestry who have resided in the United States since birth" and "Officers of field grade and captains furnished under the provisions of subparagraphs a, b and c above, will be white American citizens. Other officers will be of Japanese ancestry insofar as practicable."

In accordance with those orders, the 442d Combat Team was activated 1 February 1943, by General Orders, Headquarters Third Army. Colonel Charles W. Pence took command, with Lieutenant Colonel Merritt B. Booth as executive officer. Lieutenant Colonel Keith K. Tatom commanded the 1st Battalion, Lieutenant Colonel James M. Hanley the 2d Battalion, and Lieutenant Colonel Sherwood Dixon the 3d Battalion. Lieutenant Colonel Baya M. Harrison commanded the 522d Field Artillery, and Captain Pershing Nakada commanded the 232d Engineers.

Colonel Charles W. Pence, a World War I veteran and military science professor, commanded the regiment until he was wounded during the rescue of the "Lost Battalion" in October 1944. He was then replaced by Lieutenant Colonel Virgil R. Miller.

The US government required that all internees answer a loyalty questionnaire, which was used to register the Nisei for the draft. Question 27 of the questionnaire asked eligible males, "Are you willing to serve in the armed forces of the United States on combat duty, wherever ordered?" and question 28 asked, "Will you swear unqualified allegiance to the United States of America and faithfully defend the United States from any or all attack by foreign or domestic forces, and forswear any form of allegiance or obedience to the Japanese emperor, or any other foreign government, power or organization?"

Nearly a quarter of the Nisei males answered with a no or a qualified answer to both questions in protest, resenting the implication they ever had allegiance to Japan; some left them blank. Qualified answers included those who said, yes, but criticized the internment of the Japanese or racism. Many who responded that way were imprisoned for evading the draft. Such refusal is the subject of the postwar novel No-No Boy. But more than 75% indicated that they were willing to enlist and swear allegiance to the U.S. The U.S. Army called for 1,500 volunteers from Hawaii and 3,000 from the mainland. An overwhelming 10,000 men from Hawaii volunteered. The announcement was met with less enthusiasm on the mainland, where most draft-age men of Japanese ancestry and their families were held in concentration camps. The Army revised the quota, calling for 2,900 men from Hawaii, and 1,500 from the mainland. Only 1,256 volunteered from the mainland during this initial call for volunteers. As a result, around 3,000 men from Hawaii and 800 men from the mainland were inducted.

Roosevelt announced the formation of the 442nd Infantry Regimental Combat Team, saying, "Americanism is not, and never was, a matter of race or ancestry." Ultimately, the draft was instated to obtain more Japanese Americans from the mainland and these made up a large part of the 14,000 men who eventually served in the 442nd Regiment.

Training and organization

The 100th Infantry Battalion relocated to Camp Shelby in Mississippi. Eventually, the 100th was joined by 3,000 volunteers from Hawaii and 800 from the mainland internment camps. As a regimental combat team (RCT), the 442nd RCT was a self-sufficient fighting formation of three infantry battalions (originally 1st, 2nd, and 3rd Battalions, 442nd Infantry, and later the 100th Infantry Battalion in place of the 1st), the 522nd Field Artillery Battalion, the 232nd Engineer Company, an anti-tank company, cannon company, service company, medical detachment, headquarters companies, and the 206th Army Band.

Although they were permitted to volunteer to fight, Americans of Japanese ancestry were generally forbidden to fight in combat in the Pacific Theater. No such limitations were placed on Americans of German or Italian ancestry, who were assigned to units fighting against the Axis Powers in the European Theater. There were many more German and Italian Americans than Japanese Americans, and their political and economic power reduced the restrictions against them. Many men deemed proficient enough in the Japanese language were approached, or sometimes ordered, to join the Military Intelligence Service (MIS) to serve as translators/interpreters and spies in the Pacific, as well as in the China Burma India Theater. These men were sent to the MIS Language School at Camp Savage, Minnesota to develop their language skills and receive training in military intelligence. While the 442nd trained in Mississippi, the 100th departed for Oran in North Africa to join the forces destined to invade Italy.

Reunion with the 100th

The 442nd Combat Team, less its 1st Battalion, which had remained in the U.S. to train Nisei replacements after many of its members were levied as replacements for the 100th, sailed from Hampton Roads, Virginia, on 1 May 1944 and landed at Anzio on 28 May. The 442nd would join the 100th Battalion in Civitavecchia north of Rome on 11 June 1944, attached to the 34th Infantry Division. The 100th was placed under the command of the 442nd on 15 June 1944 but on 14 August 1944, the 100th Battalion was officially assigned to the 442nd as its 1st battalion, but was allowed to keep its unit designation in recognition of its distinguished fighting record. The 1st Battalion, 442nd Infantry at Camp Shelby was then redesignated the 171st Infantry Battalion (Separate) on 5 September 1944. The 100th Battalion's high casualty rate at Anzio and Monte Cassino earned it the unofficial nickname "Purple Heart Battalion."

First contact

The newly formed Nisei unit went into battle together on 26 June 1944 at the village of Belvedere in Suvereto, Tuscany. Although the 100th was attached to the 442nd, its actions earned it a separate Presidential Unit Citation. Second and Third Battalions were the first to engage the enemy, in a fierce firefight. F Company bore the worst fighting. A, B, and C Companies of the 100th were called into combat and advanced east using a covered route to reach the high ground northeast of Belvedere. The enemy did not know that the 100th was flanking the German exit, trapping them in Belvedere. C Company blocked the town's entrance while A Company blocked the exit. Meanwhile, the 442nd's 2nd Battalion was receiving a heavy barrage by the Germans from inside Belvedere, and the Germans remained unaware of their situation. B Company stayed on the high ground and conducted a surprise attack on the German battalion's exposed east flank, forcing the Germans to flee and run into C Company, which then drove the Germans to A Company.

The 442nd, along with its first battalion, the 100th, kept driving the enemy north, engaging in multiple skirmishes until they had passed Sassetta. The battle of Belvedere showed that the 442nd could hold their own and showed them the kind of fighting the 100th Battalion had gone through in the prior months. After only a few days of rest, the united 442nd again entered into combat on 1 July, taking Cecina and moving towards the Arno River. On 2 July, as the 442nd approached the Arno, 5th Battalion engaged in a hard-fought battle to take Hill 140, while on 7 July the 100th fought for the town of Castellina Marittima.

Hill 140 and Castellina
For the first three weeks of July, the 442nd and its 1st Battalion, the 100th, were constantly attacking German forces, leading to 1,100 enemy killed and 331 captured.

Hill 140 was the main line of enemy resistance. A single German battalion held the hill and, along with the help of artillery, had completely wiped out a machine-gun squad of L Company of the 3rd Battalion and G Company of 2nd Battalion except for its commander. A constant artillery barrage was launched against the 2nd and 3rd Battalions as they dug in at the hill's base. The 442nd gained very little ground in the coming days only improving their position slightly. The 232nd Engineers aided the 442nd by defusing landmines that lay in the 442nd's path. The entire 34th Division front encountered heavy resistance. "All along the 34th Infantry Division Front the Germans held more doggedly than at any time since the breakthrough at Cassino and Anzio." Hill 140 had been dubbed "Little Cassino" as the resistance by the Germans was so fierce. "Hill 140, when the medics were just overrun with all the casualties; casualties you couldn't think to talk about." The 2nd Battalion moved to the eastern front of Hill 140 and 3rd Battalion moved to the western front, both converging on the German flanks. It wasn't until 7 July, when the last German resistance was overcome, that the hill came under the 34th Division's control.

On the day Hill 140 fell, the battle for the town of Castellina Marittima began. The 100th began its assault on the northwestern side of the town taking the high ground. Just before dawn, 2nd Platoon C Company moved into town, encountering heavy resistance and multiple counterattacks by German forces but held them off. In the meantime Company B moved north into Castellina, encountering heavy resistance as well. First they helped defend 2nd and 3rd Battalions in the taking of Hill 140. Then with the help of the 522nd Field Artillery, they lay down a heavy barrage and forced the Germans to retreat by 1800 hours on 7 July. The 100th dug in and waited for relief to arrive after spending an entire day securing the town.

Until 25 July, the 442nd encountered heavy resistance from each town when they reached the Arno River, ending the Rome-Arno Campaign. The 100/442 suffered casualties of 1,272 men (17 missing, 44 non-combat injuries, 972 wounded, and 239 killed) in the process, a distance of only . They rested from 25 July to 15 August, when the 442nd moved to patrol the Arno. Crossing the Arno on 31 August was relatively uneventful, as they were guarding the north side of the river in order for bridges to be built. On 11 September the 442nd was detached from the Fifth Army and then attached to the 36th Infantry Division of the Seventh Army.

Antitank Company

On 15 July the Antitank Company was pulled from the frontlines and placed with the 517th Parachute Infantry Regiment, 1st Airborne Task Force. They had trained at an airfield south of Rome to prepare for the invasion of Southern France which took place on 15 August, landing near Le Muy, France. They trained for a few weeks to get used to, prepare, properly load, and fly gliders. The Southern France Campaign, 15 August to 14 September, led the 442nd to its second Presidential Unit Citation for invading in gliders and the Combat Infantryman Badge for fighting with the infantrymen of the 7th Army. The soldiers of Antitank Company received the Glider Badge. After many rough landings by the gliders, hitting trees or enemy flak, they held their positions for a few days until relieved by Allied troops coming in by sea. For the next two months the Antitank Company guarded the exposed right flank of the Seventh Army and protected the 517th Parachute Infantry. The unit also cleared mines, captured Germans, and guarded roads and tunnels. In mid-to-late October, the Antitank Company rejoined the 442nd during the battle to find the "Lost Battalion."

Vosges Mountains
After leaving Naples, the 442nd landed in Marseille on 30 September and for the next few weeks they traveled  through the Rhone Valley, by walking and by boxcar, until 13 October. On 14 October 1944 the 442nd began moving into position in the late afternoon preparing the assault on Hills A, B, C, and D of Bruyères. Each hill was heavily guarded, as each hill was key in order to take and secure the city. Hill A was located Northwest of Bruyères, Hill B to the North, Hill C Northeast, and Hill D to the East. The 442nd had experienced mainly prairie in Italy, but the Vosges Mountains provided a very different terrain. The unit faced dense fog, mud, heavy rain, large trees, hills, and heavy enemy gunfire and artillery while moving through the Vosges. Hitler had ordered the German frontline to fight at all costs as this was the last barrier between the Allied forces and Germany. On 15 October 1944 the 442nd began its attack on Bruyères. The 100th Battalion moved on Hill A, which was held by the SS Polizei Regiment 19, as 2nd Battalion moved in on Hill B. Third Battalion was left to take Bruyères.

Bruyères

After heavy fighting dealing with enemy machine guns and snipers and a continuous artillery barrage placed onto the Germans, the 100th Battalion was eventually able to take Hill A by 3 a.m. on 18 October. 2nd Battalion took Hill B in a similar fashion only hours later. Once Hill A and B were secured, 3rd Battalion along with the 36th Infantry's 142nd Regiment began its assault from the south. After the 232nd broke through the concrete barriers around town hall of Bruyères, the 442nd captured 134 Wehrmacht members including Poles, Yugoslavs, Somalis, East Indians of the Regiment "Freies Indien", 2nd and 3rd Company of Fusilier Battalion 198, Grenadier Regiment 736, and Panzer Grenadier Regiment 192. After three days of fighting Bruyères fell but was not yet secured. Germans on Hill C and D used that high-ground to launch artillery barrages on the town; Hills C and D needed to be taken to secure Bruyères.

The 442nd initially took Hills C and D but did not secure them and they fell back into German hands. By noon of 19 October, Hill D was taken by 2nd and 3rd Battalions, who then were ordered to take a railroad embankment leaving Hill D unsecure. As the 100th began moving on Hill C on 20 October, German forces retook Hill D during the night. The 100th Battalion was ordered back to Bruyères into reserve, allowing a German force onto Hill C, surprising another American division arriving into position. Retaking Hill C cost another 100 casualties. Hill D fell back into Allied hands after a short time, finally securing the town. The 232nd Engineers had to dismantle roadblocks, clear away trees and clear mine fields all in the midst of the battle. The 100th rested, then was called to the battle for Biffontaine.

Biffontaine
The 100th was ordered to take the high-ground but was eventually ordered to move into the town, leading to a bitter fight after the 100th were encircled by German forces: cut off from the 442nd, outside radio contact, and outside artillery support. The 100th were in constant battle from 22 October until dusk of 23 October, engaging in house to house fighting and defending against multiple counterattacks. 3rd Battalion of the 442nd reached the 100th and helped drive out the remaining German forces, handing Biffontaine to the 36th. On 24 October the 143rd Infantry of the 36th Division relieved the 100th and 3rd Battalion who were sent to Belmont, another small town to the north, for some short-lived rest. Nine days of constant fighting continued as they were then ordered to save T-Patchers, the 141st Regiment of the 36th Infantry, the "Lost Battalion."

Lost Battalion

After less than two days in reserve, the 442nd was ordered to attempt the rescue of the "Lost Battalion" two miles east of Biffontaine. On 23 October Colonel Lundquist's 141st Regiment, soon to be known as the "Alamo" Regiment, began its attack on the German line that ran from Rambervillers to Biffontaine. Tuesday morning, 24 October, the left flank of the 141st, commanded by Technical Sergeant Charles H. Coolidge, ran into heavy action, fending off numerous German attacks throughout the days of 25 and 26 October. The right flank command post was overrun and 275 men of Lieutenant Colonel William Bird's 1st Battalion Companies A, B, C, and a platoon from Company D were cut off  behind enemy lines. The "Lost Battalion" was cut off by German troops and was forced to dig in until help arrived. It was nearly a week before they saw friendly soldiers.

At 4 a.m. on Friday 27 October, General John E. Dahlquist ordered the 442nd to move out and rescue the cut-off battalion. The 442nd had the support of the 522nd and 133rd Field Artillery units but at first made little headway against German General Richter's infantry and artillery front line. For the next few days the 442nd engaged in the heaviest fighting it had seen in the war, as the elements combined with the Germans to slow their advance. Dense fog and very dark nights prevented the men from seeing even twenty feet. Many men had to hang onto the man in front of him just to know where to go. Rainfall, snow, cold, mud, fatigue, trench foot, and even exploding trees plagued them as they moved deeper into the Vosges and closer to the German frontlines. The 141st continued fighting—in all directions.

Airdrops with ammo and food for the 141st were called off by dense fog or landed in German hands. Many Germans did not know that they had cut off an American unit. "We didn't know that we had surrounded the Americans until they were being supplied by air. One of the supply containers, dropped by parachute, landed near us. The packages were divided up amongst us." Only on 29 October was the 442nd told why they were being forced to attack the German front lines so intensely.

The fighting was intense for the Germans as well. Gebirgsjäger Battalion 202 from Salzburg was cut off from Gebirgsjager Battalion 201 from Garmisch. Both sides eventually rescued their cut-off battalions.

As the men of the 442nd went deeper and deeper they became more hesitant, until reaching the point where they would not move from behind a tree or come out of a foxhole. However, this all changed in an instant. The men of Companies I and K of 3rd Battalion had their backs against the wall, but as each one saw another rise to attack, then another also rose. Then every Nisei charged the Germans screaming, and many screaming "Banzai!" Through gunfire, artillery shells, and fragments from trees, and Nisei going down one after another, they charged.

Colonel Rolin's grenadiers put up a desperate fight, but nothing could stop the Nisei rushing up the steep slopes, shouting, firing from the hip, and lobbing hand grenades into dugouts. Finally the German defenses broke and the surviving grenadiers fled in disarray. That afternoon the American aid stations were crowded with casualties. The 2nd platoon of Company I had only two men left, and the 1st platoon was down to twenty." On the afternoon of 30 October, 3rd Battalion broke through and reached the 141st, rescuing 211 T-Patchers at the cost of 800 men in five days. However, the fighting continued for the 442nd as they moved past the 141st. The drive continued until they reached Saint-Die on 17 November when they were finally pulled back. The 100th fielded 1,432 men a year earlier, but was now down to 239 infantrymen and 21 officers. Second Battalion was down to 316 riflemen and 17 officers, while not a single company in 3rd Battalion had over 100 riflemen; the entire 100th/442nd Regimental Combat Team was down to less than 800 soldiers. Earlier (on 13 October) when attached to the 36th Infantry, the unit was at 2,943 riflemen and officers, thus in only three weeks 140 were killed and a further 1,800 had been wounded, while 43 were missing.

General Dahlquist's legacy

As the division commander, General Dahlquist's utilization of the 442nd received mixed reviews, chiefly from the unit's officers who believed that Dahlquist considered their Nisei soldiers to be expendable cannon fodder. Despite examples of ostensibly courageous behavior, his decisions were undermined by the failure to tally victories without considerable costs. A particular example was when his aide Lieutenant Wells Lewis, the eldest son of novelist Sinclair Lewis, was killed while Dahlquist was issuing orders standing in the open during a battle. When Dahlquist ordered the 442nd to take Biffontaine, it was despite the sparsely populated farming town being militarily insignificant, out of the range of artillery and radio contact. In another example, Lieutenant Allan M. Ohata was ordered to charge with his men up a hill toward the enemy, who were dug in and well supplied. Ohata considered the order a certain suicide mission. Despite the threat of court-martial and demotion he refused, insisting that the men would be better off attacking the position "their own way." Lt. Ohata's Distinguished Service Cross, for his actions in Italy as a Staff Sergeant, was ultimately upgraded to the Medal of Honor.

On 12 November, General Dahlquist ordered the entire 442nd to stand in formation for a recognition and award ceremony. Of the 400 men originally assigned, only eighteen surviving members of K Company and eight of I Company turned out. Upon reviewing the meager assemblage Dahlquist became irritated, ignorant of the sacrifices that the unit had made in serving his orders. He demanded of Colonel Virgil R. Miller, "I want all your men to stand for this formation." Miller responded simply, "That's all of K company left, sir."

Some time later, while the former commander of the 1st Battalion, Lieutenant Colonel Gordon Singles was filling the role of brigadier general at Fort Bragg (North Carolina), General Dahlquist arrived as part of a review. When he recognized Colonel Singles he approached him and offered the colonel his hand saying, "Let bygones be bygones. It's all water under the bridge, isn't it?" In the presence of the entire III Corps, Colonel Singles continued to salute General Dahlquist but refused to take Dahlquist's hand.

During and after the war, the 442nd was repeatedly commemorated for their efforts in the Vosges Mountains. A commissioned painting now hangs in The Pentagon depicting their fight to reach the "Lost Battalion." A memorial was erected in Biffontaine by Gerard Henry, later the town's mayor. A monument was established in Bruyeres to mark the liberation of that city. At first a narrow road led to the monument, but the road was later widened to accommodate four tour buses and is now named "The Avenue of the 442nd Infantry Regiment" in honor of those brave soldiers.

Champagne Campaign
Following the tough battle through the Vosges Mountains, the 442nd was sent to the Maritime Alps and the French Riviera. It was an easy assignment compared to what they had experienced in October. Little to no action occurred in the next four months as they rested. The 442nd guarded and patrolled a twelve to fourteen-mile front line segment of the French-Italian border. This part of the 442nd's journey gained the name "Champagne Campaign" because of the available wine, women, and merry times. The 442nd experienced additional losses as patrols sometimes ran into enemy patrols, or sometimes soldiers stepped on enemy and allied land mines. Occasionally, soldiers of the 442nd captured spies and saboteurs.

The 442nd also captured an enemy submarine. A Nisei soldier noticed what looked like an animal in the water but upon closer look it was actually a one-man German midget submarine. The German and the submarine were captured and handed over to the U.S. Navy. On 23 March 1945, the 442nd Regimental Combat Team sailed back to Italy and returned to the Gothic Line.

522nd Field Artillery Battalion
From 20 to 22 March, the 442 and the 232 shipped off to Italy from France but the 522nd Field Artillery Battalion was sent to another part of Europe. They traveled northwards some  through the Rhone Valley and stopped at Kleinblittersdorf on the east bank of the Saar River. The 522nd aided the 63rd Division on the Siegfried Line defenses south of St. Ingbert from 12 to 21 March. The 522nd was the only Nisei unit to fight in Germany. On 29 April scouts of the 522nd located a satellite camp of the infamous Dachau concentration camp next to the small Bavarian town of Lager Lechfeld, adjacent to Hurlach. Scouts from the 522nd were among the first Allied troops to release prisoners from the Kaufering IV Hurlach satellite camp, one of nearly 170 such camps, where more than 3,000 prisoners were held.

As we came around the way, there were a lot of Jewish inmates coming out of the camp, and I heard that the gate was opened by our advanced scouts. They took a rifle and shot it. I think it was a fellow from Hawaii that did that. I think it was a Captain Taylor, Company B was one of them, but another person from Hawaii, he passed away. They opened the gate and all these German, I mean, Jewish victims were coming out of the camp.

Then, when we finally opened the Dachau camp, got in, oh those people were so afraid of us, I guess. You could see the fear in their face. But eventually, they realized that we were there to liberate them and help them.

They were all just skin and bones, sunken eyes. I think they were more dead than they were alive because they hadn't eaten so much because, I think, just before we got there the S.S. people had all pulled back up and they were gone. But, we went there, and outside of the camps there were a lot of railroad cars there that had bodies in them. I had the opportunity to go into the camp there, but you could smell the stench. The people were dead and piled up in the buildings, and it was just unbelievable that the Germans could do that to the Jewish people. I really didn't think it was possible at all actually.

The only thing the Nisei could really do was give them clothing and keep them warm. Nisei soldiers began to give the Jewish inmates food from their rations but were ordered to stop because the food could overwhelm the digestive systems of the starved inmates and kill them. As they continued past the subcamp, by 2 May they discovered the eastward path along which Jewish inmates were approaching Waakirchen, as the concentration camp survivors had been driven on a death march to another camp from Dachau starting there on 24 April, headed south through Eurasburg, then eastwards for a total distance of nearly sixty kilometers (37 miles), originally numbering some 15,000 prisoners.

No, my first encounter was these lumps in snow, and then I didn't know what they were, and so I went and investigated them and discovered that they were people, you know. Most of them were skeletons or people who had been beaten to death or just died of starvation or overworked or whatever. Most of them I think died from exposure because it was cold.

They discovered more subcamps and former inmates wandering the countryside. Following the German surrender, from May to November, the 522nd was assigned to security around Donauwörth, which consisted of setting up roadblocks and sentry posts to apprehend Nazis who were trying to disappear. The 522nd returned to the United States in November 1945.

Gothic Line
On 23 March 1945 the 100/442 shipped out from Marseille and traveled to Leghorn, Italy, attached to the 92nd Division. The Fifth Army had been stalemated at the Gothic Line for the prior five months. The 442nd faced extremely tough terrain, where the saw-toothed Apennines rose up from the Ligurian Sea. Starting from the northeast, the peaks hugged the east coast of Italy and stretched diagonally southward across the Italian boot. To the west, on the other side of the mountains, was the wide flat Po River Valley that led to the Austrian Alps—the last barrier to Germany. For nine months German Field Marshal Albert Kesselring directed the construction of the Gothic Line along the top of the Apennines. The Todt Organization (known for its fortifications at Monte Cassino) used 15,000 Italian slave laborers. They drilled into solid rock to make gun pits and trenches, which they reinforced with concrete. They built 2,376 machine gun nests with interlocking fire.

On the Italian Front, the 442nd had contact with the only segregated African-American active combat unit of the U.S. Army in Europe, the 92nd Infantry Division, as well as troops of the British and French colonial empires (West and East Africans, Moroccans, Algerians, Indians, Gurkhas, Jews from the Palestine mandate) and the non-segregated Brazilian Expeditionary Force which had in its ranks ethnic Japanese.

General Mark W. Clark welcomed the 442 and presented his plan to break the Gothic Line. General Clark had a disagreement with Supreme Commander Eisenhower. Clark had to negotiate for the return of the 100th and 442nd because Eisenhower wanted them for the Battle of the Bulge and General Devers, commander of the Sixth Army Group, needed fresh troops. General Clark got his wish. The 442nd and 100th, minus the 522nd, along with the 92nd Division, mounted a surprise diversionary attack on the left flank. They intended to shift enemy attention to it from the interior, allowing the Eighth Army to cross the Senio River on the right flank and then the Fifth Army on the left.

In front of the 442nd lay mountains code-named Georgia, Florida, Ohio 1, Ohio 2, Ohio 3, Monte Cerreta, Monte Folgorito, Monte Belvedere, Monte Carchio, and Monte Altissimo. These objectives hinged on surprising the Germans. The 100th went after Georgia Hill and the 3rd Battalion attacked Mount Folgorita. On 3 April the 442nd moved into position under the cover of nightfall to hide from the Germans who had good sight lines from their location on the mountains. The next day the 442nd waited. At 0500 the following morning they were ready to strike. A little over 30 minutes later objectives Georgia and Mount Folgorita were taken, cracking the Gothic Line. They achieved surprise and forced the enemy to retreat. After counterattacking, the Germans were defeated. During this time, 2nd Battalion was moving into position at Mount Belvedere, which overlooked Massa and the Frigido River.

The 442nd made a continuous push against the German Army and objectives began to fall: Ohio 1, 2, and 3, Mount Belvedere on 6 April by 2nd Battalion, Montignoso 8 April by 3rd Battalion, Mount Brugiana on 11 April by 2nd Battalion, Carrara by 3rd Battalion on 11 April, and Ortonovo by the 100th on 15 April. The 442 turned a surprise diversionary attack into an all-out offensive. The advance came so quickly that supply units had a hard time keeping up.

The Nisei drove so hard that beginning on 17 April the Germans decided to destroy their fortifications and pull back to make a final stand at Aulla. The last German defense in Italy was Monte Nebbione, directly south of Aulla. San Terenzo lay East of Mount Nobbione and became the launching point for the Aulla assault. The final drive of the 442nd began on 19 April and lasted until 23 April, when the 3rd Battalion finally took Mount Nebbione and Mount Carbolo. Following the fall of San Terenzo, 2nd Battalion hooked right around the mountains and Task Force Fukuda (consisting of Companies B and F from 2nd Battalion) flanked left from Mount Carbolo creating a pincer move onto Aulla. On 25 April Aulla fell and the German retreat was cut off. In the days that followed, Germans began to surrender in the hundreds and thousands to the Fifth and Eighth Armies. This was 442nd's final World War II action. On 2 May the war ended in Italy followed six days later by Victory in Europe.

Service decorations and legacy

The 100th/442nd Regimental Combat Team is the most decorated unit for its size and length of service in the history of American warfare. The 4,000 men who initially came in April 1943 had to be replaced nearly 2.5 times. In total, about 10,000 men served. The unit was awarded eight Presidential Unit Citations (5 earned in one month). Twenty-one of its members were awarded Medals of Honor. Members of the 442nd received 18,143 awards in less than two years, including:

21 Medals of Honor (the first awarded posthumously to Private First Class Sadao Munemori, Company A, 100th Battalion, for action near Seravezza, Italy, on 5 April 1945; 19 upgraded from other awards in June 2000). Recipients include:
Barney F. Hajiro
Mikio Hasemoto
Joe Hayashi
Shizuya Hayashi
Daniel K. Inouye
Yeiki Kobashigawa
Robert T. Kuroda
Kaoru Moto
Sadao Munemori
Kiyoshi K. Muranaga
Masato Nakae
Shinyei Nakamine
William K. Nakamura
Joe M. Nishimoto
Allan M. Ohata
James K. Okubo
Yukio Okutsu
Frank H. Ono
Kazuo Otani
George T. Sakato
Ted T. Tanouye
52 Distinguished Service Cross (including 19 Distinguished Service Crosses which were upgraded to Medals of Honor in June 2000)
1 Distinguished Service Medal
560 Silver Stars (plus 28 Oak Leaf Clusters for a second award)
22 Legion of Merit Medals
15 Soldier's Medals
4,000 Bronze Stars (plus 1,200 Oak Leaf Clusters for a second award; one Bronze Star was upgraded to a Medal of Honor in June 2000. One Bronze Star was upgraded to a Silver Star in September 2009.)
More than 4,000 Purple Hearts

In 1962 Governor John Connally of Texas made the members of the 442nd RCT honorary Texans in appreciation of their rescue of the Lost Battalion of the Texas National Guard in the Vosges in 1944.

On 5 October 2010, Congress approved the granting of the Congressional Gold Medal to the 442nd Regimental Combat Team, the 100th Infantry Battalion, and Nisei serving in the Military Intelligence Service. The Nisei Soldiers of World War II Congressional Gold Medal was collectively presented on 2 November 2011.

In 2012, the surviving members of the 442nd RCT were made chevaliers of the French Légion d'Honneur for their actions contributing to the liberation of France during World War II and their heroic rescue of the Lost Battalion outside of Biffontaine.

5 April is celebrated as National "Go For Broke Day", in honor of the 442nd's first Medal of Honor recipient, Pfc. Sadao Munemori, killed in action near Seravezza, Italy on 5 April 1945.

The Japanese American Memorial to Patriotism During World War II in Washington, D.C. is a National Park Service site honoring Japanese American veterans who served in the Military Intelligence Service, 100th Infantry Battalion, 442nd RCT, and other units, as well as the patriotism and endurance of those held in Japanese American concentration camps and detention centers.

The Go for Broke Monument in Little Tokyo, Los Angeles, California, commemorates the Japanese Americans who served in the United States Army during World War II.

California has given four state highway segments honorary designations for Japanese American soldiers:
State Route 23 between U.S. Route 101 and State Route 118 is named the Military Intelligence Memorial Freeway;
State Route 99 between Fresno and Madera is named the 100th Infantry Battalion Memorial Highway;
State Route 99 between Salida and Manteca is named the 442nd Regimental Combat Team Memorial Highway;
The interchange between the I-105 and I-405 freeways in Los Angeles is labeled the Sadao S. Munemori Memorial Interchange.

The USS Hornet Museum in Alameda, California, has a permanent special exhibit honoring the 442nd Infantry Regiment.

On November 17, 2020, the United States Postal Service (USPS) announced they would release in 2021 a postage stamp honoring the contributions of Japanese American soldiers, 33,000 altogether, who served in the U.S. Army during World War II, following a multi-year nationwide campaign. The "stamp our story" campaign started in 2006.

Original Fight Song
Original fight song of the 442nd RCT Hawai'i Go For Broke Lyrics by Martin Kida -KIA, Score by T.Y.—

After the war

The record of the Japanese Americans serving in the 442nd and in the Military Intelligence Service (U.S. Pacific Theater forces in World War II) helped change the minds of anti-Japanese American critics in the continental U.S. and resulted in easing of restrictions and the eventual release of the 120,000-strong community well before the end of World War II. In Hawaii, the veterans were welcomed home as heroes by a grateful community that had supported them through those trying times.

However, the unit's exemplary service and many decorations did not change the attitudes of the general population in the continental U.S. towards people of Japanese ancestry after World War II. Veterans came home to signs that read "No Japs Allowed" and "No Japs Wanted", the denial of service in shops and restaurants, and the vandalism of their homes and property.

On 15 July 1946, the 442nd Regiment marched down Constitution Avenue to the Ellipse south of the White House. President Truman gave a speech and honored the regiment by awarding them the Presidential Unit Citation. The American Legion refused to allow Nisei veterans into their group and removed Japanese-American soldiers from their honor rolls. It was not until white officers from the 442nd regiment intervened that the Legion began to accept Nisei veterans into the organization. Many Nisei veterans had difficulty finding houses in the continental United States. Their homes were occupied with new tenants. Due to the housing shortage, many Nisei veterans resorted to using federal housing programs. Many Nisei veterans used the G.I. Bill as an opportunity to attend university. Many Nisei became doctors, dentists, architects, scientists, and engineers.

Anti-Japanese sentiment remained strong into the 1960s, but faded along with other once-common prejudices, even while remaining strong in certain circles. Conversely, the story of the 442nd provided a leading example of what was to become the controversial model minority stereotype.

According to author and historian Tom Coffman, men of the 100th/442nd/MIS dreaded returning home as second-class citizens. In Hawaii these men became involved in a peaceful movement. It has been described as the 100th/442nd returning from the battles in Europe to the battle at home. The non-violent revolution was successful and put veterans in public office in what became known as the Revolution of 1954.

One notable effect of the service of the Japanese-American units was to help convince Congress to end its opposition towards Hawaii's statehood petition. Twice before 1959, residents of Hawaii asked to be admitted to the U.S. as the 49th state. The exemplary record of the Japanese Americans serving in these units and the loyalty showed by the rest of Hawaii's population during World War II allowed Hawaii to be admitted as the 50th state (Alaska was granted statehood just prior).

In post-war American popular slang, the phrase "going for broke" was adopted from the 442nd's unit motto "Go for Broke", which according to the 1951 film Go for Broke! was derived from the Hawaiian pidgin phrase used by craps shooters risking all their money on one roll of the dice.

Demobilization and rebirth

The 442nd RCT was inactivated in Honolulu in 1946, but reactivated in 1947 in the U.S. Army Reserve. It was mobilized in 1968 to refill the Strategic Reserve during the Vietnam War, and carries on the honors and traditions of the unit. Today, the 100th Battalion, 442nd Infantry, is the only ground combat unit of the Army Reserve. The battalion headquarters is at Fort Shafter, Hawaii, with subordinate units based in Hilo, American Samoa, Saipan, and Guam. The only military presence in American Samoa consists of the battalion's B and C companies.

In August 2004, the battalion was mobilized for duty in Iraq. Stationed at Logistics Support Area Anaconda in the city of Balad, which is located about 50 miles northwest of Baghdad. Lt. Colonel Colbert Low assumed command of the battalion only a few weeks after the battalion arrived at Logistical Support Area Anaconda. In early 2006, the 100th had returned home. One soldier was killed by an improvised explosive device attack. Four members of the battalion were killed in action, and several dozen injured, before the battalion returned home. During the year-long deployment, one of Charlie Company's attached platoons, discovered over 50 weapons caches. Unlike the soldiers of World War II who were predominantly Japanese Americans, these soldiers came from as far away as Miami, Florida, Tennessee, Alaska and included soldiers from Hawaii, Philippines, Samoa and Palau. For their actions in Iraq the unit received the Meritorious Unit Commendation.

The unit was once again deployed in 2009. The unit was called up alongside the 3rd brigade, 25th Infantry Division; and was assigned as an element of the 29th Infantry Brigade Combat Team. Nominally deployed to Kuwait, it conducted patrols into Iraq, leading to two fatalities; those patrols consisted of more than a million miles of driving conducting convoy duty. During the units deployment, several dozen of the unit's American Samoan servicemembers became naturalized U.S. citizens while in Kuwait.

Notable members

S. Neil Fujita, graphic designer. Designed many book and album covers. Head of Columbia Records Art Dept designing jazz album covers after WW II. Among his book covers are "The Godfather" logo and typeset for the 1969 novel and later used for the film's advertising. Designed "The Today Show" sunrise logo used from the 70's to the present day.
Takashi "Halo" Hirose, first Japanese American to represent the United States in any international swimming competition, and the first to set a swimming world record; awarded five battle stars, the Combat Infantryman Badge and a Presidential Unit Citation. Inducted into Ohio State University's Sports Hall of Fame and the International Swimming Hall of Fame.

Daniel Inouye, U.S. Representative from Hawaii (1959–62); U.S. Senator from Hawaii (1962–2012); President pro tempore of the Senate (2010–12); awarded the Medal of Honor and Purple Heart. Inouye had wanted to become a surgeon before he lost his right arm in the combat action for which he was later awarded the Medal of Honor.
Dale Ishimoto, actor in many films, TV shows, and commercials
Susumu Ito, Emeritus Professor of Cell Biology and Anatomy, Harvard Medical School (1960–90)
Isao Kikuchi, graphic designer, illustrator, carver, and painter. Illustrated Welcome Home Swallows and Blue Jay in the Desert.
Colonel Young-Oak Kim, the only Korean American officer during his service in 442nd Infantry. First officer from an ethnic minority to command a U.S. Army combat battalion.
Spark Matsunaga, U.S. Representative from Hawaii (1962–76); U.S. Senator from Hawaii (1977–90)
Sadao Munemori, the only Japanese American to be awarded the Medal of Honor during or immediately after World War II
Lane Nakano, actor, featured in the 1951 film Go for Broke!, father of writer and director Desmond Nakano
Shinkichi Tajiri, sculptor, member of the COBRA art movement, 1955 Golden Palm Winner at Cannes, Purple Heart
James Takemori, judoka and recipient of the Order of the Rising Sun

In popular culture

 Allegiance the Musical: This musical, about the challenges faced by a Japanese-American family, is set in the present day with flashbacks to the 1940s. It was inspired by the experiences of George Takei, who spent his childhood in concentration camps. It stars George Takei, Lea Salonga and Telly Leung.
American Pastime: This 2007 fictional film depicts life inside the concentration camps, where baseball was one of the major diversions from the reality of the internees' lives. Location scenes were filmed in bleak, desolate land, not far from the site of an actual camp. Lane Nomura, the oldest son enlists in the Army, as a member of the 442nd Regimental Combat Team. The unit motto, "Go for broke!", provides inspiration at a climactic moment, and reference is made to the losses taken by the 442nd during the rescue of the Lost Battalion.
Go for Broke!: This 1951 film dramatizes the lives and wartime heroics of the 442nd Regimental Combat Team. The film stars Van Johnson as a young officer, reluctant about his assignment to the 442nd. He comes to respect the Nisei troops, eventually refusing a transfer back to his original Texas unit. The movie starred a number of veterans of the 442nd. It can be found on iTunes.
The "One Puka Puka" episode of The Gallant Men television series featured the unit with guest stars Poncie Ponce and George Takei.
The James Michener novel Hawaii has a chapter detailing the 442nd's experiences, although its designation is changed to the 222nd and many of the members appear under fictionalized names.
Ed Sakamoto wrote a play about the 100th/442nd entitled Our Hearts Were Touched by Fire, which was performed in Honolulu and Los Angeles.

In the series of four Karate Kid movies, Mr. Miyagi is a main character portrayed as a World War II veteran who had fought in the 442nd and received the Medal of Honor. The fourth film, The Next Karate Kid, begins with a reunion of the 442nd, in which Sen. Daniel Inouye gives a speech and Mr. Miyagi wears his Medal of Honor for the only time in any of the four films.
The Nisei Project: In 2001, choreographer Marla Hirokawa premiered her "Nisei" ballet in Brooklyn, NY which was inspired by her late father, 100th Battalion veteran and gave honor to the men of the 100th/442nd. In 2003, Marla and sister Laurie Hamano produced a "Nisei" ballet tour across the Hawaiian Islands. (Lane Nishikawa toured and performed with the dance company.) In 2014, "Nisei" was re-staged and presented at the NY International Fringe Festival with a revised score that included songs about the Nisei veterans composed by ukulele virtuoso Jake Shimabukuro and singer/songwriter Harold Payne.
In 2005, Lane Nishikawa directed and starred in the independent film Only the Brave, which is a fictional account of the rescue of the Lost Battalion.
"Family 8108", the 9 December 2007 episode of the CBS TV show Cold Case centers around the Japanese concentration camps and discusses the 442nd Regional Combat Team.
Ken Burns' 2007 PBS World War II documentary The War explores the stories of four American towns' experiences with the war. Burns' 15-hour documentary goes in depth in describing the many battles of World War II, including those of the 442nd Infantry Regiment.
Sgt. Rock: The Lost Battalion #1–6 (2008) graphic novel
99 Years of Love 〜Japanese Americans〜: In 2010 TBS produced a five-part, 10-hour fictional Japanese-language miniseries featuring many of the major events in Japanese-American history. Episode 4 features a key character who serves in the 442nd and portrays the rescue of the Texas Battalion.
Captain America: The First Avenger (2011) features Kenneth Choi as the character of Jim Morita, a Nisei soldier separated from his unit that joins with Dum Dum Dugan and the Howling Commandos. Choi again reprised the role in an episode of Agents of S.H.I.E.L.D.
Valor With Honor is an 85-minute independent documentary film on the last interviews of veterans of the 442nd Regimental Combat Team. Interviews, war footage, and photos are part of the un-narrated documentary.
In Drunk History season 2 episode 15 "Hawaii", Phil Hendrie tells the story of Daniel Inouye of the 442nd Infantry Regiment enlisting after the Japanese-American ban is lifted and later losing his arm in the assault on Colle Musatello in Italy.
In Hawaii Five-0 season 4 episode 10, the brother of the suspect whose family was placed in an internment camp is shown as a member of the battalion. It gives some information about the battalion and states that his brother who was of age did not want to stay in the camp, so he joined the Army in that battalion as did many of the other boys who were of age.
The story of the 442nd Infantry Regiment appeared in an episode of the American Heroes Channel series What History Forget, entitled "Fighting for Freedom". The episode featured an interview with Susumu Ito that was shot shortly before his death in 2015.
In Bad Day at Black Rock (1955), a US Army veteran seeks the father of a 442nd colleague who died saving his life in order to give him his son's posthumous medals. The plot centers on the town's hatred for the Japanese-American community.
Go for Broke: An Origin Story (2018) follows a group of University of Hawaii ROTC students during the tumultuous year after the attack on Pearl Harbor, as they navigate wartime Hawaii and fight discrimination. Adaptation of the comic book by Stacey Hayashi.
The experience of Nisei soldiers in Europe and the Pacific was fictionalized for the Japanese market in the novel "Futatsu no Sokoku (Two Homelands)" by Toyoko Yamasaki in 1983. It was dramatized into a limited series of the same name by TV Tokyo in 2019.
Repentance (2019) is an historical novel based on the history of the 442nd Regimental Combat Team by Andrew Lam.
In 2017, the 442nd Infantry Regiment was the subject of the short documentary Nisei Soldiers: Japanese American G.I. Joes, directed by Alexander Zane Irwin and produced by Daniel L. Bernardi with the collaboration of El Dorado Films and the Veteran Documentary Corps.

See also
Admission of Hawaii Act
Japanese American service in World War II
List of documentary films about the Japanese American internment
Manzanar
Military history of Asian Americans#World War II
Military Intelligence Service (United States)

References

External links

Resources
Japanese American War Hero Recalls Life During World War II
Asian-Nation: 442nd RCT Rescue of the Lost Battalion
The 442nd Regimental Combat Team
Hawaii Star Bulletin article on Hawaii Statehood passage 
"U.S. Samurais in Bruyeres" by Pierre Moulin
The Story of the 442nd Combat Team compiled by members of the 442nd Combat Team, Mitsuye Yamada papers, Special Collections and Archives, The UC Irvine Libraries, via Calisphere.
"From a Quiet American, a Story of War and Remembrance". The New York Times. 16 August 2008.
Medal of Honor recipient George Joe Sakato on Veterans Chronicles  produced by the
Japanese American Veterans Collection, Archives & Manuscripts Department, University of Hawaii at Manoa Library
"442nd Regimental Combat Team" by Franklin Odo, Densho Encyclopedia
442nd Regimental Combat Team Legacy Website

Media
442-Live with Honor, Die with Dignity: Documentary Film 2010
Only the Brave official movie site
The official website for upcoming movie Little Iron Men about the 442nd's rescue of the Lost Battalion
A Path to Lunch Liberation Day and the Liberation of America, the 442nd in Lunigiana and Versilia.

George Takei: Why I love a country that once betrayed me TEDxKyoto 2014
Four-Four-Two, F Company At War: 2014 Documentary Film

Organizations

442nd World War II Reenactors

Military units and formations in Hawaii
442
Japanese-American history
American military personnel of Japanese descent
442
Military units and formations established in 1944
Infantry regiments of the United States Army in World War II
Congressional Gold Medal recipients
Recipients of the Presidential Unit Citation (United States)
WWII